Ned is a 2003 Australian film, directed by Abe Forsythe. It is satire of Australian outlaw Ned Kelly, and his iconographical status as a "hero."

The film was released in the same year as Ned Kelly, starring Heath Ledger.

In November 2006 on Vega FM host Shaun Micallef called Ned "The funniest Australian film made in the last ten years."

References

External links

Review at SBS Movie show
Ned at the National Film and Sound Archive

2003 films
Bushranger films
Australian comedy films
Australian satirical films
Cultural depictions of Ned Kelly
2003 comedy films
2000s satirical films
2000s English-language films
2000s Australian films